Flit of Fury/The Monarch is a ballet made by New York City Ballet soloist Adam Hendrickson to music by City Ballet corps dancer Aaron Severini for the Spring 2008 Dancers' Choice benefit, which took place on Friday, 27 June 2008, with women's costume by Magda Berliner, men's costumes by the choreographer and lighting by Mark Stanley.

Original cast 

Gretchen Smith
Sean Suozzi
Robert Fairchild
Allen Peiffer
David Prottas

References

Playbill, NYCB, Friday, 27 June 2008

External links 
NY Times review by Alastair Macaulay, 30 June 2008

2008 ballet premieres
New York City Ballet repertory